Hans Kuschke (25 February 1914 – 30 November 2003) was a German rower who competed in the 1936 Summer Olympics.

In 1936 he won the bronze medal as crew member of the German boat in the men's eight competition.

References

1914 births
2003 deaths
Olympic rowers of Germany
Rowers at the 1936 Summer Olympics
Olympic bronze medalists for Germany
Olympic medalists in rowing
German male rowers
Medalists at the 1936 Summer Olympics